The 2019–20 season was the Bengaluru FC's seventh season as club since its establishment in 2013.

Background

Transfers
In May 2019, Bengaluru FC signed goal keeper Prabhsukhan Singh Gill and midfielder Suresh Singh Wangjam from Indian Arrows. Bengaluru also signed a contract extension with Kean Lewis, Dimas Delgado and Albert Serrán. Midfielder Eugeneson Lyngdoh returned to Bengaluru FC for a one-year deal. On 17 July Bengaluru FC announced signing of Spanish forward Manuel Onwu Bengaluru FC announced signing of Brazilian midfielder Raphael Augusto on two year deal. On 27 August Bengaluru FC announced signing of India international midfielder Ashique Kuruniyan on four year deal from FC Pune City for undisclosed transfer fee. In the mid season transfer window, Bengaluru FC signed Jamaican striker Deshorn Brown as seventh foreigner. Brown signed for one and half year, will keep him with the club till the end of the 2020-21 season. On 28 January Bengaluru FC announced signing of spanish winger Nili Perdomo till end of the season. He replaced striker Manuel Onwu On 12 February Bengaluru FC announced signing of Jamaican striker Kevaughn Frater in place of injured Raphael Augusto on short term deal.

On 4 June Bengaluru FC announced transfer of midfielder Boithang Haokip to East Bengal for undisclosed fee. Spanish midfielder Xisco Hernández signed for Delhi Dynamos. Venezuelan striker Miku ended his two year stint with the club. Midfielder Myron Mendes
signed for Gokulam Kerala. Goalkeeper Soram Poirei signed for NorthEast United. Midfielder Bidyananda Singh signed for Mumbai City FC. Robinson Singh and Asheer Akhtar who were promoted from reserves team to the senior team, joined TRAU F.C. and East Bengal F.C. respectively. Foreign players Álex Barrera, Chencho Gyeltshen, and Luisma were also released.

In the winter transfer window, Ajay Chhetri was loaned out to Hyderabad FC till the end of the season. Edmund Lalrindika was given two years contract extension and loaned out to I-League side East Bengal F.C. till the end of the season. Striker Manuel Onwu was loaned out to Odisha FC till the end of the season.

In

Out

Out on loan

Pre-season and friendlies
Bengaluru FC started pre-season with a friendly against I-League club Churchill Brothers on 27 September 2019 at Bellary. Bengaluru won the game 3–1 with Erik Paartalu scoring the opening goal and Ajay Chhetri scoring a brace in the second half. Playing the next friendly against Gokulam Kerala, Bengaluru were handed 1–3 defeat, with Kean Lewis scoring the solitary goal. In the final phase of pre-season, Bengaluru played two games against Minerva Punjab F.C., winning the first 1–0 with a goal from Thongkhosiem Haokip, and losing the second by the same margin.

Competitions

Indian Super League

League stage

Playoffs

Table

Results by matchday

AFC Cup

As the winner of 2018–19 Indian Super League season, Bengaluru FC qualified for 2020 AFC Cup qualifiers. This will be Bengaluru's fifth appearance in the tournament after missing out in 2019.

Qualifying play-offs

Bengaluru FC faced Paro FC from Bhutan in preliminary round and won 10–1 on aggregate to advance for playoff round. In playoff round Bengaluru FC faced Maziya S&RC from Maldives, but failed to advance after losing out on penalties.
 
Preliminary round

Playoff

4–4 on aggregate. Maziya won 4–3 on penalties.

Coaching Staff

Management

Carles Cuadrat extended his contract for two years with the club after the successful 2018–19 season.
As of 30 January 2020

Player statistics

Appearances and goals

|-
! colspan=12 style=background:#dcdcdc; text-align:center| Goalkeepers

|-
! colspan=12 style=background:#dcdcdc; text-align:center| Defenders
|-

|-
! colspan=12 style=background:#dcdcdc; text-align:center| Midfielders
|-

 

 

 

|-
! colspan=12 style=background:#dcdcdc; text-align:center| Forwards
|-

  

|-
! colspan=12 style=background:#dcdcdc; text-align:center| Players transferred out during the season 
|-
 

Updated: 8 March 2020

Top scorers

Source: soccerway
Updated: 8 March 2020

Clean sheets

Source: soccerway
Updated: 8 March 2020

Disciplinary record

Source: soccerway
Updated: 8 March 2020

Awards

Player of the Month award

Awarded monthly to the player that was chosen by fan voting

Notes

References

See also
 2019–20 in Indian football

Bengaluru FC seasons
2020s in Bangalore
2010s in Bangalore
Bengaluru